Matthäus Abbrederis (1652 – c. 1725) was an Austrian organist and organ builder. Born in Rankweil, he was baptized on 17 April 1652.

Many of his contemporaries in the Rhine Valley, south of Lake Constance, considered him an outstanding master of organ building.  Though influenced by the Baroque style of the 17th century, he was not constrained by the version that flourished in South Germany. Many of his organs still survive, such as the one for the monastery church of Pfäfers, Switzerland, built in 1693.

References 

Organ builders
Austrian musical instrument makers
Austrian organists
Male organists
1652 births
1720s deaths
Year of death uncertain
Date of death unknown
Date of birth unknown